Total Divas is an American reality television series that premiered on July 28, 2013, on E!. The series gave viewers an inside look of the lives of WWE Divas from their work within WWE to their personal lives. Behind the scene footage of the Divas is also included.

Production
Season 6 was officially confirmed on April 18, 2016, by the E! Network with a fall premiere date and the majority of last season's cast returning, along with Naomi returning as a series regular and Renee Young, Lana, and Maryse replacing Rosa Mendes, Alicia Fox, and Mandy Rose.

On July 7, TJ, Nattie's husband, confirmed via Twitter that he would not be appearing on the upcoming season of Total Divas.

Cast

Main cast
 Brie Bella (Brianna Danielson)
 Eva Marie (Natalie Marie Coyle)
 Naomi (Trinity Fatu)
 Natalya (Natalie Neidhart-Wilson)
 Nikki Bella (Stephanie Garcia-Colace)
 Paige (Saraya-Jade Bevis)
 Lana (Catherine Perry)
 Maryse (Maryse Mizanin)
 Renee Young (Renee Paquette)

Recurring cast
 Alicia Fox (Victoria Crawford)
 Summer Rae (Danielle Moinet)
 Daniel Bryan (Brie's husband)
 Jimmy Uso (Naomi's husband)
 John Cena (Nikki's fiancé)
 Mark Carrano (WWE Senior Director of Talent Relations)
 Kathy Colace (Brie & Nikki's mother)
 Dolph Ziggler (Nicholas "Nick" Nemeth)
 Rusev (Lana's husband)
 The Miz (Maryse's husband)
 Dean Ambrose (Renee's husband)

Guest stars
 JoJo (Joseann Offerman)
 Rosa Mendes (Milena Roucka)
 Jonathan Coyle (Eva Marie's husband)
 Alberto Del Rio (José Alberto Rodríguez)
 Dana Brooke (Ashley Sebera)
 Emma (Tenille Dashwood)
 John Laurinaitis (WWE employee & Kathy's husband)
 Tamina (Sarona Snuka-Polamalu)
 Jim Neidhart (Nattie's father)
 Lilian Garcia (Former WWE Ring Announcer)
 Ellie Neidhart (Nattie's mother)
 J.J. Garcia (Brie & Nikki's brother)
 Jenni Neidhart (Nattie's sister)

Episodes

Ratings

References

External links

 
 

2016 American television seasons
2017 American television seasons
Total Divas